The Virginia Beach Dart Classic is a Steel-Tip darts tournament established in 1970. The tournament is currently organised by the Tidewater Area Darts Association  which is itself affiliated to the American Darts Associations (ADO). The event is a BDO category C ranked tournament  the youth tournament is a ranked event of the WDF.

List of tournament winners

Men's
Included:

Women's

References

External links
Official American Darts Organization website
2019 edition results

1970 establishments in Virginia
Darts tournaments